Napeanthus is a genus of plant in family Gesneriaceae. It contains the following species (but this list may be incomplete):
 Napeanthus ecuadorensis, Fritsch

 
Gesneriaceae genera
Taxonomy articles created by Polbot